Tamil Muslims are Tamils who practise Islam. The community is 5.7 million in India, primarily in the state of Tamil Nadu where 70% of the Muslim community identified themselves as Tamils. The Tamil-speaking Muslims are descendants of marriages between early West Asian Muslims and Tamil women as well as local converts. The community is matrilineal, matriarchal and matrilocal. There is a substantial diaspora, particularly in Southeast Asia, which has seen their presence as early as the 13th century. In the late 20th century, the diaspora expanded to Western Europe, Persian Gulf and North America. A separate Tamil-speaking Muslim population also exists in Sri Lanka known as the Sri Lankan Moors, who do not identify as Tamils but are a mixture of Arab, Persian, South Indian and Malay ancestries of which the Dravidian element is predominant because of centuries of heavy Indian injection. Historically, both these Tamil speaking communities in India and Sri Lanka were known as the Sonakar, which is derived from the term Yona, originally meaning a West Asian.

Ethnic identity

Though numerically nominal, the community is not homogeneous. Its origin is shaped by centuries of miscegenation and trade between the Bay of Bengal and the Maritime Southeast Asia. By the 20th century, certain Tamil races began to be listed as social classes in official gazettes of different nations as Rowther, Marakkar, and Labbay.

Rowther 

Of Anatolian descent, the Rowther sect is a entrepreneurial community settled in the deltaic districts of Tamil Nadu. They were famous for their cavalry and horse trade. They are found as Zamindar, Mirazudar and Polygar.

Marakkayar

Of Arab descent, the Marakkar sect has been a maritime trading community in the southern districts of Tamil Nadu. One notable sea-faring merchant, as recorded in the Chronicles of Thondaiman, was Periya Thambi Nainar Marakkayar who is widely believed to be the first rupee millionaire. His son Seethakaathi, an altruist, commissioned the penning of Seerapuranam by Umaru Pulavar. B. S. Abdur Rahman was the first rupee billionaire Marakkayar. The 11th president of India A. P. J. Abdul Kalam was also born to a Marakkayar boat-builder.

Labbay

Similar to the Jewish Levite, the Labbay sect mainly engages in religious scholarship and avoids entrepreneurial activities.

Economy

In Tamil Nadu, the community is well known as rentiers, entrepreneurs, gemstone jewellers and money changers with above State-average GDP per capita incomes.

Culture

Legends and rituals
As a mark of modesty, Rowther women traditionally wear white thuppatti which is draped over their body on top of the saree but revealing face. This is in marked contrast to black full body veil of Urdu community. Many visit dargah on major life milestones like births, marriages and deaths and recite mawlid.

Rowther weddings have retained several Rajput traditions across generations like grooms going on a horseback procession. Surnames (identifying caste or tribe like Bohra, Bukhari, Chishti, Khan, Syed, Sahib, Shah, etc) were positively discouraged by the community to avoid sectarianism in line with Dravidian reform movement of 20th century.

Art
Music involves distinctively the Turkish daf and other percussion instruments.

Cuisine
Cuisine is a tell-tale syncretic mixture of Tamil and other Asian recipes. Biriyani is the favourite in banquets while congee is the favourite during the fasting month of Ramadan. There are many regional improvisations. For instance, a semolina ghee cake with soft centre and hard crust at the top, is popular in the deltaic households.

Literature
Culture and literature are heavily influenced by the Qadiri flavour of Sufism. Their domain range from mystical to medical, from fictional to political, from philosophical to legal and spiritual.

The earliest literary works in the community could be traced to Palsanthmalai, a work of eight stanzas written in the 13th century. In 1572, Seyku Issaku, better known as Vanna Parimala Pulavar, published Aayira Masala Venru Vazhankum Adisaya Puranam detailing the Islamic principles and beliefs in a FAQ format. In 1592, Aali Pulavar wrote the Mikurasu Malai. The epic Seerapuranam by Umaru Pulavar is dated to the 17th century and still considered as the crowning achievement in canonical literature. Other significant works of 17th century include Thiruneri Neetham by Sufi master Pir Mohammad, Kanakabhisheka Malai by Seyku Nainar (alias Kanakavirayar), Tirumana Katchi by Sekathi Nainar and the Iraqi war ballad Sackoon Pataippor.

Nevertheless, an independent identity evolved only in the last quarter of the 20th century triggered by the rise of Dravidian politics as well as the introduction of new mass communications and lithographic technologies. The world's first Tamil Islamic Literature Conference was held in Trichy in 1973. In early 2000s, the Department of Tamil Islamic Literature was set up in the University of Madras. Modern notable writers include Mu. Metha and Pavalar Inqulab,

Law and polity

Pre-independence
Kalifulla served as the minister for public works in the Cabinet of Kurma Venkata Reddy Naidu in 1937. He was sympathetic to the cause of Periyar E. V. Ramasamy and his Self-Respect Movement. He spoke against the introduction of compulsory Hindi classes in the Madras legislature and participated in the anti-Hindi agitations. He was a lawyer by profession and was known by the honorifics Khan Bahadur. He became the Dewan of Pudukottai after withdrawal from political work. Mohammad Usman was the most prominent among the early political leaders of the community. In 1930, Jamal Mohammad became the president of the Madras Presidency Muslim League. Yakub Hasan Sait served as a minister in the Rajaji administration. Karim Ghani, veteran freedom fighter and a close associate of Subash Chandra Bose, who hailed from Ilayangudi, served as Information Minister in Netaji ministry during the 1930s.

Post-independence
Since the late 20th century, politicians like Muhammad Ismail (first President of Indian Union Muslim League) and Dawood Shah advocated Tamil to be made an official language of India due to its antiquity in parliamentary debates The community was united in a single political party under Quaid-e-Millath presidency for 27 years keeping rabble-rousers away until his death in 1972. His support was invaluable for ruling parties in the state, as well as in the Centre. He was instrumental in framing and obtaining the minority status and privileges for minorities in India thus safeguarding the Constitution of India. His newspaper Urimaikkural was a very popular daily.

S. M. Muhammed Sheriff was the first elected IUML MP from Tamil Nadu. He produced clear documentary evidence that Kachchatheevu belonged to India. During the Emergency, he was the advisor to the Governor. M. M. Ismail became Chief Justice in 1979 and was sworn in as Acting Governor of Tamil Nadu in 1980. As Kamban Kazhagam president, he organised literary festivals, that focussed on classical Tamil literature. Justice S. A. Kader who was the Judge of Madras High Court during 1983-89 became the President of Tamil Nadu State Government Consumer Disputes Redressal Commission on retirement. In the early 1990s, the Indian National League split from the IUML. The non-denominational social reform movements (called Ghair Muqallid) began to take the front stage (to fight superstition creep) spearheaded by P. Jainulabdeen further weakening the IUML and causing unrest among community elders who preferred status quo. Nevertheless, the Tamil Nadu Muslim Munnetra Kazagham was constituted in 1995. This non-profit organisation quickly became popular and assertive among the working class youth.

21st century
In 2009, the Manithaneya Makkal Katchi, the political arm of TMMK was formed. The TMMK itself split to form the break-away organisation Tamil Nadu Thowheed Jamath soon. In 2011, MMK won 2 of 3 contested Assembly seats viz. Ambur (A. Aslam Basha) and Ramanathapuram (M. H. Jawahirullah). Broadly speaking, the community tends to support laissez faire and free trade; and have been unimpressed by Communism as a public policy though fringe groups often called for affirmative action in the last quarter of the 20th century. New generation of leaders like Daud Sharifa Khanum have been active in pioneering social reforms like independent mosques for women. MLAs and MPs such as A. Anwar Rhazza, J. M. Aaroon Rashid, Abdul Rahman, Jinna, Khaleelur Rahman, S. N. M. Ubayadullah, Hassan Ali and T. P. M. Mohideen Khan are found across all major Dravidian political parties like DMK, DMDK and AIADMK, as well as national parties like the INC. At the age of 30, the award-winning documentarian Aloor Shanavas became the Deputy General Secretary of Viduthalai Chiruthaigal Katchi.

Demographics

Notable Tamil Muslims

See also

 Tamil Muslim population by cities

References

Further reading
Sinnappa Arasaratnam, Merchants, Companies and Commerce on the Coromandel Coast 1650 – 1740, New Delhi 1986
Maritime India in the Seventeenth Century, New Delhi 1994
Maritime Commerce and English Power (South East India), 1750 – 1800, New Delhi 1996
Dutch East Indian Company and the Kingdom of Madura, 1650 – 1700, Tamil Culture, Vol. 1, 1963, pp. 48–74
A Note on Periyathambi Marakkayar, 17th century Commercial Magnate, Tamil Culture, Vol. 10, No.1, 1964, pp. 1–7
Indian Merchants and the Decline of Indian Mercantile Activity, the Coromandel case, The Calcutta Historical Journal, Vol. VII, No. 2/1983, pp. 27–43
Commerce, Merchants and Entrepreneurship in Tamil Country in 18th century, paper presented in the 8th World Tamil Conference seminar, Thanjavur, 1995

External links

Muslim communities of India
Tamil society
Social groups of Tamil Nadu
Islam in Tamil Nadu